José Vega Díez (born 10 April 1981 in Jerez de la Frontera, Province of Cádiz, Andalusia) is a Spanish former professional footballer who played as a left winger.

External links

1981 births
Living people
Spanish footballers
Footballers from Jerez de la Frontera
Association football wingers
Segunda División players
Segunda División B players
Tercera División players
Divisiones Regionales de Fútbol players
Xerez CD footballers
CD San Fernando players
Real Madrid C footballers
Cultural Leonesa footballers
Alicante CF footballers
Terrassa FC footballers
Écija Balompié players
Elche CF players
Córdoba CF players
San Fernando CD players